The ork is a demon of Tyrol alpine folklore. He lives on mountains, almen, rock holes, or valleys. He warns the noble game of hunters, or can be savage and bring geisser to the cattle. He was feared like the aufhocker. As a dwarf, the ork was a well-behaved kobold/house spirit in wine cellars. He may be connected to the figure Orkise in the medieval poem Virginal, about Dietrich von Bern's battle with a vaguely similar being.

A particular kind of ork is the Orco Burlevole (Tricky Ork), very popular in the area of Verona. This tall, horse-hoofed and horse-haired man, who lives in caves or abandoned houses, can assume any form, produce any sound and even alter the victim's perception of place or time. Despite his great power, his only goal is to play jokes on the victims and, when he has had his fun, he disappears in a sulphur cloud saying "Te l'ho fatta!" meaning, in the local language, "I fooled you" or “I got you”. But it does not necessarily always say that.

External links
https://web.archive.org/web/20140916051451/http://www.sphinx-suche.de/lexmonst/ork.htm

Alpine folklore
Demons
Dwarves (folklore)
Kobolds